The class MH was a class of diesel-hydraulic locomotives of the Danish State Railways (DSB), built by Danish manufacturer Frichs. A total of 120 units, numbered 301–420, were delivered between 1960 and 1965. They were primarily used for shunting and light freight traffic.

Their design was strongly based on that of the slightly earlier MH 201–203 built by Henschel, using the same MAN diesel engine and Voith hydraulic transmission.

Apart from a few units damaged in accidents, the locomotives were mostly retired between the late 1980s and 2000.

Notes

Bibliography

External links 

 DSB Litra MH at jernbanen.dk 

MH
Frichs locomotives
C locomotives
Railway locomotives introduced in 1960
Diesel locomotives of Denmark
Standard gauge locomotives of Denmark